West Branch State Park is a public recreation area located east of Ravenna, Ohio, on the west branch of the Mahoning River. Activities include boating, fishing, and swimming on the Michael J. Kirwan Reservoir, hiking, and camping.

History
In early days, Native Americans and some early settlers used the Mahoning River as a source for salt.
Captain John Campbell who led militia in the War of 1812 opened the oldest brick land office building around 1810. Before the reservoir was made, the building was moved out of the area.

The U.S. Army Corps of Engineers constructed the Michael J. Kirwan Reservoir in 1965. The reservoir was developed for recreation, water supply, flood control, and fish and wildlife management. The U.S. Army Corps of Engineers then leased the land to the state of Ohio to be used as a state park. West Branch State Park was officially opened in 1966.

Recreation

References

External links

 West Branch State Park Ohio Department of Natural Resources
 West Branch State Park Map Ohio Department of Natural Resources

State parks of Ohio
Protected areas of Portage County, Ohio
Protected areas established in 1966
1966 establishments in Ohio